Potoki is a small village in the Upper Nadiža Valley in the Municipality of Kobarid in the Littoral region of Slovenia. It is located in the Breginj Combe.

References

External links

Potoki on Geopedia

Populated places in the Municipality of Kobarid